Il Trionfo della Divina Giustizia (Naples 1716) is the second oratorio of Nicola Porpora.

References

1716 operas